Märta Dorff (1909–1990) was a Swedish film actress.

Selected filmography

 Adventure (1936) - Karl Henriks sekreterare (uncredited)
 Witches' Night (1937) - Student (uncredited)
 For Better, for Worse (1938) - Nurse
 Pengar från skyn (1938) - A woman
 Nothing Is Forgotten (1942) - Dinner guest (uncredited)
 The Girl from the Third Row (1949) - Mrs. Burén
 Singoalla (1949) - Elfrida Månesköld
 While the City Sleeps (1950) - Iris' Mother
 Miss Julie (1951) - Kristin, cook
 Encounter with Life (1952)
 The Firebird (1952) - Seamstress
 Love (1952) - Selma Danielsson
 Unmarried Mothers (1953) - Mrs. Berglund
 The Girl from Backafall (1953) - Mrs. Larsson
 Dance, My Doll (1953) - Hildur
 No Man's Woman (1953) - Mrs. Henriksson
 All the World's Delights (1953) - Anna
 Marianne (1953) - Birger's Mother
 The Beat of Wings in the Night (1953) - Head Nurse
 Speed Fever (1953) - Ellen
 A Night in the Archipelago (1953) - Fru Lundkvist
 Our Father and the Gypsy (1954) - Frasse's Wife
 Storm Over Tjurö (1954) - Mrs. Sofia Bohm
Taxi 13 (1954) - Taxi Exchange Manager
 Flicka med melodi (1954) - Mrs. Bergvall
 En karl i köket (1954) - Ms. Eriksson
 Simon the Sinner (1954) - Simon's Mother
 The Girl in the Rain (1955) - Matron
 The Dance Hall (1955) - Ofelia
 Getting Married (1955) - Aunt Emilia's guest (uncredited)
 Violence (1955) - Vera's mother
 The Unicorn (1955) - Anna, nurse (uncredited)
 Sista ringen (1955) - Eva Svensson
 Janne Vängman och den stora kometen (1955) - Mother Bengta
 Rätten att älska (1956) - Margareta Borg
 The Stranger from the Sky (1956) - Train passenger (uncredited)
 Det är aldrig för sent (1956) - Housemaid
 Kulla-Gulla (1956) - Mamsell Modigh
 The Hard Game (1956) - Ester, Conny's mother
 Värmlänningarna (1957) - Lisa
 Playing on the Rainbow (1958) - Marriage officiate
 Fröken Chic (1959) - Ms. Söderlund, Teacher (uncredited)
 Lita på mej älskling (1961) - Hostess at the Inn
 Loving Couples (1964) - Alexandra Vind-Frija
 ...för vänskaps skull... (1965) - Brita, Eva's mother
 The Corridor (1968) - Mrs. Olsson
 City of My Dreams (1976) - Tvätt-Johanna

References

Bibliography 
 Soila, Tytti. The Cinema of Scandinavia. Wallflower Press, 2005.

External links 

1909 births
1990 deaths
Actresses from Stockholm
Swedish film actresses
20th-century Swedish actresses